Christopher Golden (born July 15, 1967) is an American author of horror, fantasy, and suspense novels for adults and teens.

Early life
Golden was born and raised in Massachusetts, where he still lives with his family. He graduated from Tufts University.

Career
As well as novels, Golden has written comic books and video games, and co-written the online animated series Ghosts of Albion with actress/writer/director Amber Benson. He co-created and co-writes the Dark Horse Comics series Baltimore with Mike Mignola and wrote the introduction to the now collectible, 200-only copies, slipcased edition of Joe Hill's book of short stories titled 20th Century Ghosts. He has also edited numerous horror and dark fantasy fiction anthologies.

Golden worked on the script for Hellboy, a reboot film based on Mignola's comic series Hellboy, though he ultimately was uncredited.

Bibliography

Novels

 Strangewood (Signet, 1999)
 Straight On 'Til Morning (Signet, 2001)
 The Ferryman (Signet, 2002)
 The Boys Are Back in Town (Bantam, 2004)
 Wildwood Road (Bantam, 2005)
 Bloodstained Oz - co-authored with James A. Moore (Earthling Publications 2006)
 Seven Whistlers (Subterranean, 2006; co-authored with Amber Benson)
 Baltimore, or The Steadfast Tin Soldier and the Vampire (co-authored with Mike Mignola)
 Poison Ink (Delacorte, 2008)
 Soulless (MTV Books, 2008)
 When Rose Wakes (2010)
 Joe Golem and the Drowning City (2012)
 Father Gaetano's Puppet Catechism (2013)
 Snowblind (2014)
 Tin Men (2015)
 Dead Ringers (2015)
 Indigo (2017; co-authored with Charlaine Harris)
 Blood of the Four (2018; co-authored with Tim Lebbon)
 Road of Bones (2022)
 All Hallows (2023)

The Hidden Cities 
The Hidden Cities series, all co-authored with Tim Lebbon
 Mind the Gap (Spectra, 2008)
 Map of Moments (Spectra, 2009)
 The Chamber of Ten (Spectra, 2010)
 The Shadow Men (Spectra, 2011)

The Veil 

 The Myth Hunters (Bantam, 2006)
 The Borderkind (Bantam, 2007)
 The Lost Ones (Bantam, 2008)

The Shadow Saga 

 Of Saints and Shadows (Berkley, 1994)
 Angel Souls and Devil Hearts (Berkley, 1995)
 Of Masques and Martyrs (Ace, 1998)
 The Gathering Dark (Berkley, 2003)
 Waking Nightmares (Berkley, 2011)
 The Graves Of Saints (Simon & Schuster UK, 2013)
 King of Hell (Simon & Schuster UK, 2014)

The Menagerie 
The Menagerie series all co-authored with Tom Sniegoski
 The Nimble Man (Ace, 2004)
 Tears of the Furies (Ace, 2005)
 Stones Unturned (Ace, 2006)
 Crashing Paradise (Ace, 2007)

Ghosts of Albion 
Ghosts of Albion related books are co-authored with Amber Benson.
 Accursed (Del Rey, 2005)
 Astray (Subterranean, 2005)
 Initiation (Subterranean, 2006)
 Witchery (Del Rey, 2006)

Hellboy 
Hellboy related books with cover and other illustrations by Mike Mignola
 Hellboy: The Lost Army (Dark Horse, 1997)
 Hellboy: The Bones of Giants (Dark Horse, 2001)
 Hellboy: The Dragon Pool (Pocket Books, 2007)

Body of Evidence 

 Body Bags (Pocket, 1999)
 Thief of Hearts (Pocket, 1999)
 Soul Survivor (Pocket, 1999)
 Meets the Eye (Pocket, 2000)
 Head Games (Pocket, 2000)
 Skin Deep - co-authoered with Rick Hautala (Pocket, 2000)
 Burning Bones - co-authoered with Rick Hautala (Pocket, 2001)
 Brain Trust - co-authoered with Rick Hautala (Pocket, 2001)
 Last Breath - co-authoered with Rick Hautala (Pocket, 2004)
 Throat Culture - co-authoered with Rick Hautala (Pocket, 2005)

OutCast 
All co-authored with Tom Sniegoski
 OutCast: The Un-Magician (Pocket, 2004)
 OutCast: Dragon Secrets (Pocket, 2004)
 OutCast: Ghostfire (Pocket, 2005)
 OutCast: Wurm War (Pocket, 2005)

Prowlers 

 Prowlers (Pocket, 2001)
 Laws of Nature (Pocket, 2001)
 Predator and Prey (Pocket, 2001)
 Wild Things (Pocket, 2002)

Buffy the Vampire Slayer 
Buffy the Vampire Slayer related books.
 Halloween Rain - Co-authored with Nancy Holder (Pocket, 1997)
 Blooded - Co-authored with Nancy Holder (Pocket 1998)
 Child of the Hunt - Co-authored with Nancy Holder (Pocket 1998)
 The Gatekeeper series - all co-authored with Nancy Holder
The Gatekeeper, Book One: Out of the Madhouse (Pocket 1999)
The Gatekeeper, Book Two: Ghost Roads (Pocket 1999)
The Gatekeeper, Book Three: Sons of Entropy (Pocket 1999)
 Immortal - co-authored with Nancy Holder (hardcover, Pocket, 1999)
 Sins of the Father (Pocket, 1999)
 Spike & Dru: Pretty Maids All in a Row (hardcover, Pocket, 2000)
 The Lost Slayer a 4-part series(Pocket 2001)
The Lost Slayer I: Prophecies
The Lost Slayer II: Dark Times
The Lost Slayer III: King of the Dead
The Lost Slayer IV: Original Sins
 Oz: Into the Wild (Pocket, 2002)
 The Wisdom of War (Pocket, 2002)
 Monster Island co-authored with Tom Sniegoski (hardcover, Pocket, 2003)
 Dark Congress (Simon Spotlight, 2007)

Ben Walker 

 Ararat (2017)
 The Pandora Room (2019)
 Red Hands (2020)

Young adult novels 

 Beach Blanket Psycho (Bantam YA, 1995)
 Bikini (Bantam YA, 1995)
 Force Majeure co-authored with Tom Sniegoski (Pocket, 2002)
 Poison Ink (Delacrote YA, 2008)

The Hollow series
Young adult series co-authored with Ford Lytle Gilmore.  The series is based on Washington Irving's The Legend of Sleepy Hollow.
Horseman (Pocket, 2005)
Drowned (Pocket, 2005)
Mischief (Pocket, 2006)
Enemies (Pocket, 2006)

The Waking 
Young adult series written under the pseudonym Thomas Randall
Dreams of the Dead (Bloomsbury, 2009)
Spirits of the Noh (Bloomsbury, 2011)
A Winter of Ghosts (Daring Greatly Corporation, 2013)

The Secret Journeys of Jack London 
Young adult series co-authored with Tim Lebbon and with illustrations by Greg Ruth
The Wild (HarperCollins, 2011)
The Sea Wolves (HarperCollins, 2012)
White Fangs (Daring Greatly Corporation, 2013)

Other media tie-ins 
Battlestar Galactica
 Battlestar Galactica: Armageddon
 Battlestar Galactica: Warhawk
Daredevil
 Daredevil: Predator's Smile
Gen¹³
 Gen¹³: Netherwar - co-authored with Jeff Mariotte
Justice League
 Justice League: Exterminators
King Kong
 King Kong - official novelization of the 2005 film
X-Men
 X-Men: Mutant Empire-Siege
 X-Men: Mutant Empire-Sanctuary
 X-Men: Mutant Empire-Salvation
 X-Men: Codename Wolverine
Uncharted
 Uncharted: The Fourth Labyrinth
Sons of Anarchy
 Sons of Anarchy: Bratva (2014), the first in a planned series of SOA novels
Alien
Alien: River of Pain
The Predator
The Predator

Comics
 Punisher (Marvel Edge, 1998-1999)
 Talent (with Thomas E. Sniegoski, Boom! Studios, 2006)
 The Sisterhood (with Tom Sniegoski, Archaia, 2008)
 Baltimore: The Plague Ships (with Mike Mignola, Dark Horse Comics, 2010)
 Baltimore: The Curse Bells (with Mike Mignola, Dark Horse Comics, 2011)
 Baltimore: A Passing Stranger and Other Stories (with Mike Mignola, Dark Horse Comics, 2012)
 Baltimore: Chapel of Bones (with Mike Mignola, Dark Horse Comics, 2013)
 Baltimore: The Apostle and the Witch of Harju (with Mike Mignola, Dark Horse Comics, 2014)

Anthologies Contributed 

 Thin Walls (Aug 2010) in Death's Excellent Vacation

Anthologies Edited

 The New Dead: A Zombie Anthology, 2010
 The Monster's Corner: Stories Through Inhuman Eyes, 2011
 21st Century Dead: A Zombie Anthology, 2012
 Dark Duets, 2014
 Seize the Night, 2015
 Hex Life, 2019 (co-edited with Rachel Autumn Deering)

See also

 Angel comics
 Angel novels 
 Buffy comics
 Buffy novels 
 Ghosts of Albion
 Tales of the Slayer

References

External links

 Official Web Site
 

1967 births
Living people
Choose Your Own Adventure writers
20th-century American novelists
21st-century American novelists
American male novelists
20th-century American male writers
21st-century American male writers